Robert "Bo" Hines (born August 29, 1995) is an American former college football player from North Carolina. He played college football for the NC State Wolfpack and Yale Bulldogs. In 2022, he was the Republican nominee in North Carolina's 13th Congressional District.

Early life and education
Hines was born in Charlotte, North Carolina. He attended Charlotte Christian School, and played football as a wide receiver.

Hines attended North Carolina State University to play college football for the NC State Wolfpack. He led NC State with 45 receptions and 616 receiving yards, including three passes for 79 yards in the 2014 St. Petersburg Bowl.

In 2015, Hines transferred to Yale University because of his interest in politics. He played in four games for the Yale Bulldogs during the 2015 season, catching 11 passes for 134 yards, but missed the rest of the season and the 2016 season due to a separated shoulder that required surgery. 

In 2017, Hines retired from college football. He received his Juris Doctor degree from Wake Forest University School of Law in 2022.

Politics 
Once the North Carolina Congressional lines were redrawn, Hines switched to run in the open 6th congressional district based in Greensboro, North Carolina where he spent much of his time campaigning.

In February 2022, the North Carolina Supreme Court struck down North Carolina’s congressional lines, stating they were “unconstitutional beyond a reasonable doubt under the free elections clause, the equal protection clause, the free speech clause, and the freedom of assembly clause of the North Carolina Constitution.” After the North Carolina Supreme Court struck down the district lines, Hines switched districts to run in the newly created 13th congressional district which was based in the suburbs of Raleigh. He received the endorsement of former President Donald Trump on March 14th, who called Hines a “fighter for Conservative values.” 

In April 2022, local Republicans campaigned against Hines through newspaper advertisements, email blasts and door-knocking because Hines did not live in the district in which he was running.

2022 election

On May 17th, Hines won the Republican Primary against seven opponents, garnering 32 percent of the vote, defeating his nearest opponent by nearly double digits. Hines narrowly lost the election to Democratic state Senator Wiley Nickel.

In May 2022, Business Insider reported that Hines was funding the majority of his campaign with a trust fund. This was disproven later on when campaign finance disclosures showed only 28 percent of his race was self-funded with a majority coming from individual contributions. While campaigning on "America-First economy", Hines faced criticism because his campaign hats were made in China. 

On the campaign trail, Hines said he is pro-life but added in an interview with WRAL News on October 1, that abortion is a state's rights issue. Hines said, "This is a Raleigh issue, not a Washington issue." Hines expressed belief that the 2020 election was stolen and promoted voter fraud conspiracy theories.

According to December 2022 Federal Election Commission documents, Hines campaign remains in debt leaving small businesses unpaid.

Personal life
Hines's father Todd played for the Detroit Lions of the National Football League and the Hamilton Tiger-Cats of the Canadian Football League. Hines married Olivia Elizabeth Andretti in June 2017. The couple divorced in July 2019, and Hines married Mary Charles Bryson in July 2021.

References

External links

1995 births
American football wide receivers
Living people
NC State Wolfpack football players
North Carolina Republicans
Yale Bulldogs football players
Candidates in the 2022 United States House of Representatives elections
Charlotte Christian School alumni
Wake Forest University School of Law alumni